HMS Vigilant was a 64-gun third-rate ship of the line of the Royal Navy, launched on 6 October 1774 at Bucklers Hard.

By 1779 she had been deemed unseaworthy by the navy.  She was stripped of her sails and used as a floating battery to support the amphibious landing of British Army troops on Port Royal Island, South Carolina prior to the Battle of Beaufort.
From 1799 she served as a prison ship, and was broken up in 1816.

Citations and references
Citations

References

Lavery, Brian (2003) The Ship of the Line - Volume 1: The development of the battlefleet 1650-1850. Conway Maritime Press. .

External links
 

Ships of the line of the Royal Navy
Intrepid-class ships of the line
1774 ships
Ships built on the Beaulieu River
Floating batteries of the Royal Navy